Ocean to Ocean is the sixteenth studio album by American singer-songwriter Tori Amos, released on October 29, 2021. A vinyl release followed on January 28, 2022. Amos has supported the album with a 6-date UK/Ireland tour in March 2022, and a 34-date US tour that followed between April 27 and June 17, 2022; EU dates have been postponed to April 5 through April 30, 2023 due to the pandemic.

Background and composition
Amos shelved a whole record she had prepared upon entering the third lockdown of the pandemic at the beginning of 2021 in Cornwall, where she lives. She explained:

Amos then wrote and recorded a new album while in lockdown in Cornwall, with her writing inspired by her fascination with "the county's landscapes and ancient myths". Part of her writing was also explained to be in reaction to the 2021 United States Capitol attack. The first song written for the finalized album was "Metal Water Wood".

In a press release, Amos described the album as "a record about your losses, and how you cope with them". She elaborated that she realized she had to "write" to "shift" her perception of herself, saying: "I was in my own private hell, so I told myself, then that's where you write from—you've done it before." Amos also explained that the album is intended to "sit" with listeners, particularly if they are "in a place of loss. [...] When somebody is actually at that place, thinking 'I'm done,' how do you reach that person? [...] It's about sitting in the muck together."

As Amos shot the album cover on August 17, 2021 and the album was being mixed, three more songs were written: "Addition of Light Divided", "Swim To New York State", and "29 Years".

Recording and mastering 
Due to Cornwall under lockdown during the pandemic, instruments aside from the piano were recorded outside of Martian Engineering Studios, without Amos' presence. 

Speaking on the vocal arrangements on the album: 

During mastering, the sequencing of the album was being discussed. It was considered to open the album with "Metal Water Wood" but ultimately was deemed to be "too literal". The placement of it and of "Devil's Bane" was a point of contention, with a faction of those involved wanted the latter placed farther down the album whereas another faction wanted it earlier.

Other songs 

Speaking about a track named "Ballerina":

Recording for a 9-minute song named "Chiron" was not completed due to time constraints in order to complete "Addition of Light Divided".

Critical reception 
"Ocean to Ocean" received universal acclaim from music critics upon release. The album received a score of 81 out of 100 on the review aggregator website Metacritic, based on nine reviews, making it Amos' most well-received album since Metacritic began tracking reviews in 2001.

Track listing

Personnel
Musicians
 Tori Amos – vocals, piano (all tracks); Hammond B3, keyboards, Rhodes, Wurlitzer electric piano (1–6, 8–11)
 John Philip Shenale – Marxophone, Optigan, sampling, synthesizer (all tracks); additional keyboards (1, 3–5, 11), Hammond organ (4, 5, 11)
 Tash – additional vocals (1–3)
 Jon Evans – bass (1–6, 8–11)
 Matt Chamberlain – drums, percussion (1–6, 8–11)
 Mark Hawley – guitar (1–6, 8–11), dobro (2, 3)

Technical
 Jon Astley – mastering
 Miles Showell – vinyl mastering
 Adrian Hall – mixing
 Mark Hawley – mixing, recording
 Jon Evans – recording (1–6, 8–11)
 John Philip Shenale – recording (1, 3–5, 11)
 Matt Chamberlain – recording (1–6, 8–11)
 Adam Spry – recording assistance

Artwork and design
 Matt Read – package design
 Desmond Murray – photography, hair stylist
 Kavita Kaul – make-up

Charts

References

2021 albums
Albums impacted by the COVID-19 pandemic
Cornwall in fiction
Decca Records albums
Tori Amos albums